KBFY-LD (channel 41) is a low-power television station licensed to Yuma, Arizona, United States, serving the Yuma, Arizona–El Centro, California market. It is owned by KBFY, LLC. KBFY-LD's transmitter is located northwest of Yuma.

Technical information

Subchannels
The station's digital signal is multiplexed:

References

External links

Television stations in Arizona
Low-power television stations in the United States
Scripps News affiliates
Laff (TV network) affiliates
Defy TV affiliates
TrueReal affiliates
Buzzr affiliates
Television channels and stations established in 2000
2000 establishments in Arizona